Liam Ó Buachalla (10 April 1899 – 15 October 1970) was a Fianna Fáil politician from Drogheda, County Louth in Ireland. He was active as a financial expert in the Irish War of Independence. He was a Senator from 1939 to 1969, and was twice elected as Cathaoirleach of Seanad Éireann.

A Professor of Economics at University College Galway (UCG), Ó Buachalla was nominated by the Taoiseach Éamon de Valera to the 3rd Seanad in 1939, to fill the vacancy caused by the death of Colonel Maurice Moore. He was re-appointed to the 4th Seanad and to the 5th. After Fianna Fáil lost power at the 1948 general election, the new Fine Gael Taoiseach was unlikely to reappoint him, and he was elected to the 6th Seanad on the Cultural and Educational Panel. He was re-elected five times, until he stood down at the 1969 Seanad election.

He was Cathaoirleach (chairman) of the Seanad from 1951 to 1954, and from 1957 to 1969, and also served as Leas-Chathaoirleach (deputy chairman) from 1954 to 1957.

He lectured through Irish in Commerce and Economics from his appointment as part of the programme for the Gaelicization of Third Level under the !929 Act. He was author of many textbooks amongst which were "Bunadhas na Tráchtála", "Bunadhas an Gheileagair", "Cúntais agus Cúntaisíocht", "ArdChúntaisíocht" and "Forás Teoiricí an Gheilleagair".

He was the founder of the highly successful "Scoltacha Éigse agus Seanchais" in the Conamara Gaeltacht.

His wife Máire Ní Scolaí was a notable singer of songs in Irish both seannós and common style and also an actress. She created the role of Gráinne in the Taibhdhearc 1928 première of Mícheál mac Liammóir's drama "Diarmuid agus Gráinne". She cut many records and broadcast frequently at home and abroad. A champion dancer her pièce de rèsistance was "The Blackbird".

References

1899 births
1970 deaths
Academics of the University of Galway
Cathaoirligh of Seanad Éireann
Fianna Fáil senators
Members of the 3rd Seanad
Members of the 4th Seanad
Members of the 5th Seanad
Members of the 6th Seanad
Members of the 7th Seanad
Members of the 8th Seanad
Members of the 9th Seanad
Members of the 10th Seanad
Members of the 11th Seanad
Politicians from County Galway
Nominated members of Seanad Éireann